The Copa Panamá (Spanish for Panama Cup, officially known as Copa Cable Onda Satelital because of its sponsorship with Cable Onda) is a Panamanian football cup competition. Its first edition was held in 2015.

The competition is open to eligible clubs down to the third tier of the Panamanian football league system – all 10 and 14 teams from the Liga Panameña de Fútbol and Liga Nacional de Ascenso respectively participate as well as 8 of the highest ranking amateur teams in the Copa Rommel Fernández tournament based on the results and points they obtained during the FIFA calendar year prior to the start of the cup.

While previous domestic cup competition in Panama existed during the amateur era, the Copa Panamá represents the first time this type of competition is organized by the Panamanian Football Federation.

Format
The competition is a knockout tournament with pairings for each round made in advance; the draw for the whole competition is made before any matches are played. Each tie is played as a single leg, with the exception of the two-legged quarter-finals and semi-finals. If a match is drawn, extra time is played and in the event of a draw after 120 minutes, a penalty shoot-out is contested.

There are a total of 5 rounds in the competition which begins in August. In the single leg ties clubs from lower-ranking leagues are given field preference when facing opponents from a higher-ranked league.

List of finals

Performances

Top goalscorers by season

References

 
Football in Panama
Panama
Recurring sporting events established in 2015